Leo Patrick McLaughlin (June 5, 1888May 5, 1958) was an American politician who served as the mayor of Hot Springs, Arkansas from 1927 to 1947, and in the Arkansas House of Representatives in 1911. He was the head of a political machine in Garland County, Arkansas.

McLaughlin was born in Hot Springs in 1888, and was educated at Hot Springs High School while shortly attending the University of Arkansas. He entered politics in the 1910s with him serving as a member of the state house before being elected as city attorney in Hot Springs. He was temporarily out of politics after being drafted into the United States Army, but returned to the position of city attorney.

McLaughlin was elected as mayor of Hot Springs in 1927. During his tenure illegal gambling was rampant and criminals, such as Al Capone and Lucky Luciano, received protection. His opponents, under the leadership of Sid McMath, defeated members of his political machine in the 1946 election and took the mayoralty in the 1947 election after McLaughlin dropped out due to an investigation. The charges against him were dropped and he unsuccessfully attempted to return to politics before dying in 1958.

Early life and education

Leo Patrick McLaughlin was born in Hot Springs, Arkansas, on June 5, 1888, as one of eight children of Irish immigrants John Henry McLaughlin and Bridget Adela Russell. John left Ireland during the Great Famine and immigrated to Maryland in 1850, before moving to Memphis, Tennessee, and then Hot Springs. He graduated from Hot Springs High School in 1908, and was president in his senior year.

Career

State politics

McLaughlin was an alternate delegate to the Democratic Party of Arkansas' state convention in 1910, a delegate to the 1914 convention, and a delegate to the 1948 Democratic National Convention. He and Representative George Whittington were given the nomination to run for the seats representing Garland County in the Arkansas House of Representatives and won in the 1910 election. McLaughlin, at age 22, was the youngest member of the state house. He served on the Judiciary, Banks and Banking, and Natural Resources committee.

McLaughlin supported Stephen Brundidge Jr. for the Democratic gubernatorial nomination in 1913 and later supported George Washington Hays. He supported Governor Carl E. Bailey's campaign for a seat in the United States Senate in the 1937 special election. He led Attorney General Jack Wilson Holt Sr.'s campaign in Garland County during the 1942 U.S. Senate election.

Local politics

McLaughlin received the Democratic nomination to run for city attorney of Hot Springs and defeated Sam McConnell, a member of the Republican Party who ran as an independent, in the 1912 election. He replaced J.A. Stallcup as the city attorney. He was a member of the Garland County Democratic Central Committee and was selected to be its secretary in 1912. He served as the party's chair and Jacob L. King, a member of McLaughlin's opposition, succeeded him as chair in 1948.

McLaughlin was reelected twice before being defeated by Jas S. McConnell, a Republican running as an independent, in the 1916 election due to Democratic voters, who voted for other offices, choosing to not vote in his election. He defeated McConnell and Sam Garrett in the 1918 election. However, he was drafted into the United States Army on May 27, 1918, where he served as a corporal before his honorable discharge on April 26, 1919. Orlando H. Sumpter was elected to replace him until McLaughlin reassumed the office after his military service. He was reelected in the 1920 election, with all of the candidates running as independents due to a lack of a primary, against Sumpter and Sidney S. Taylor.

Mayoralty

McLaughlin defeated Sidney Nutt in the 1927 election. He defeated Elmer Tackett, a former member of the state house, in the 1937 election. He was accused of electoral fraud during his tenure with allegations of paying people's poll taxes and threatening to fire government workers who did not vote.

Criminals, such as Al Capone and Lucky Luciano, received protection by McLaughlin's Hot Springs government from law enforcement. A political machine was operated in the city and county by McLaughlin, Earl Witt, and Vernal Ledgerwood. Illegal gambling was sanctioned in the city with fees being paid to the local government to avoid police raids and McLaughlin advertised the city as a place to gamble. When an airport was constructed in Hot Springs it was named McLaughlin Field in his honor in 1946, but was later renamed to Hot Springs Memorial Field in 1947.

Sid McMath was one of the leading opponents against McLaughlin's political machine and the Government Improvement League, which was made up almost entirely of veterans, was formed under his leadership in 1945. McLaughlin's opponents, with McMath as one of their lawyers, challenged the receipts of 3,825 poll taxes, accounting for over one-third of the amount in the 1946 Democratic primary. Judge John E. Miller ruled that 1,607 of the poll taxes were invalid. The GI League won all of the county elections in the 1946 election except for constable and state senate. Ledgerwood stated in a post-election radio address that McLaughlin's regime came to an end and he did not seek reelection in 1947.

McLaughlin filed to run in the 1947 election, but later announced that he would not seek reelection after a grand jury launched an investigation into his administration. Earl T. Ricks defeated Clyde Wilson, who received McLaughlin's support, in the election.

Later life and death

A grand jury indicted McLaughlin on four charges of bribery, two charges of conversion of city funds, and a charge of failure to file a city financial report on March 18, 1947, and was given a bond of $40,500. His brother George, secretary Hazel Marsh, and Elmer Walters were also indicted. Additional charges were filed against him, including robbery. He was acquitted on one charge and the remainder were dismissed. A lawsuit attempting to remove him as chair of the Garland County Democratic Central Committee was withdrawn due to McLaughlin leaving office and his indictment.

McLaughlin attempted to reenter politics after his mayoral tenure by running for city attorney as an independent in the 1952 election, but failed to qualify. He died on May 5, 1958, due to uremia.

Personal life

J. W. McClendon, the mayor of Hot Springs, threatened to shoot McLaughlin's brother George while he was working as an election judge in a school board election in 1916, and was convicted for aggravated assault resulting in a sentence of one hour in jail and a $50 fine.

On June 19, 1918, McLaughlin married Juanita Gilliam in Rapides Parish, Louisiana, but she filed for divorce on September 5, 1919, in Denver, Colorado, and a judgement was made in her favor on November 18, although it was not finalized until June 2, 1921. He married Mary Francis Frink in 1931, but it ended in divorce a few months later. He married Florence Paul on November 4, 1931, the same day his previous marriage ended, and divorced her in 1936.

McLaughlin attended the University of Arkansas for two weeks and never took a bar examination, but he worked as a lawyer for forty-five years. In 1937, Paul claimed during their divorce proceedings that McLaughlin's estate was worth $500,000. He was the president of the Hot Springs Broadcasting Company which was formed to prevent the removal of the KTHS station.

References

Works cited
 
 
 

20th-century American politicians
Democratic Party members of the Arkansas House of Representatives
1888 births
1958 deaths
University of Arkansas alumni
City and town attorneys in the United States
Politicians from Hot Springs, Arkansas
Mayors of places in Arkansas
Arkansas lawyers
Deaths from uremia
American people of Irish descent